Kardex has been the name or part of the name of companies tracing back to Rand Ledger founded in 1898, which were closely associated with the development of the index card as a common business data storage device, and which were also associated with the entities that eventually became part of Unisys.

Kardex as a company name was introduced in 1915, subsumed in 1927 (it remained as a brand name and a division name), and revived in 1977. It is currently borne by the Kardex Group, based in Zurich, Switzerland, which makes filing system components as well as many other products for handling materials and information, mostly in physical form. Kardex has also become a generic trademark within the health services of the United Kingdom and Ireland to refer to a medication administration record.

Separate Rand-led companies (1898–1925)

Rand Ledger (1898–1925)
American Ledger was founded by James H. Rand, Sr. in 1898. Rand had been a banker for many years and had come to see that existing index card systems used by clerks were inefficient. What was needed was a rationalized system using dividers, file tabs, and labels. Rand Sr. invented an improved filing system based on these concepts and founded the Rand Ledger Company to manufacture his index system, called the Visible Ledger.

James Rand, Jr. joined his father's company after being graduated from Harvard University in 1908 and ran it from 1910 through 1914. In 1915 the elder Rand re-assumed control of the company and Rand Jr., unable to reach agreement with his father on business matters, left.

American Kardex (1915–1925)
James Rand, Jr. formed his own filing and index supply company, American Kardex, in 1915. Within five years, American Kardex grew to be one of the leading office supply companies in the United States. It was roughly equal in revenues to Rand Ledger, and the two companies easily dominated the American office supply market. In 1920, American Kardex had more than $1 million in gross sales. The company's products were widely used in the health care field ("filling a kardex" became a common term for entering data into a patient's medical record), and demand in Europe was so strong that Rand soon built a factory in Germany.

Rand Kardex Bureau (1925–1927)
As competition between American Kardex and Rand Ledger intensified, Mary Rand (James H. Rand, Sr.'s wife and James Rand, Jr.'s mother) brokered a reconciliation between father and son. In 1925, the two men agreed that American Kardex should purchase Rand Ledger. The new company, Rand Kardex, was the largest office supply company in the United States. James Rand, Sr. became the company chairman, while James Rand, Jr. was its president and general manager.

James Rand Jr. soon began expanding the company through acquisitions. He bought companies including Index Visible, Safe-Cabinet, Dalton Adding Machine, Baker-Vawter Ledger, and Library Bureau (founded in 1876 by Melvil Dewey), which was probably the first company to sell filing cabinets commercially (around 1900) and may have invented them.

In its brief existence, the company was first known as Rand Kardex and then, after the acquisition of Library Bureau, as Rand Kardex Bureau.

Remington Rand (1927–1955)

In 1886, E. Remington and Sons sold its typewriter business and the rights to the Remington name to the Standard Typewriter Manufacturing Company which in 1902 changed its name to Remington Typewriter Company. In 1927 Rand Kardex merged with Remington Typewriter. The new company was called Remington Rand, and Kardex was a division and brand of that company.

Remington Rand was led by James Rand Jr. for the duration of its independent existence. Company sales grew from $5 million in 1927 to $500 million in 1954, although market share suffered in the face of competition from IBM.

Remington Rand purchased the Eckert–Mauchly Computer Corporation in 1950, delivered the UNIVAC I in 1951, and bought Engineering Research Associates in 1952, all this making them a major player in the new computer industry.

Sperry Rand (1955–1978)

In 1955, Sperry Corporation acquired Remington Rand and renamed itself Sperry Rand. Remington Rand remained as a separate brand name and in the name of some divisions. The Remington Rand Systems division was concerned with filing systems and associated products such as file folders, and other material and physical data storage and handling systems, including Kardex.

In 1978 Sperry Rand decided to concentrate on the computer business, and sold a number of divisions including Remington Rand Systems. (Remington Rand Machines was also sold along with some other divisions, and the company dropped "Rand" from its title and reverted to Sperry Corporation; in 1986 they merged with Burroughs Corporation to form Unisys.)

Kardex Systems (1978–2008)
The Remington Rand Systems division of Sperry Rand, now based in Marietta, Ohio, was acquired by Aarque Management Corporation of Jamestown, New York, and renamed to Kardex Systems to take advantage of Kardex's status as a long-famous brand in filing systems.

In 2003 the company was sold to RACK Enterprises and Ronald Miller was made president.

Miller established a separate company, Randex, also selling filing and storage system components, for operation in Europe. Randex continued to exist as a separate company under Miller family control after Kardex Systems was sold to Remstar.

In 2008 Kardex Systems was acquired by Remstar AG of Zurich, Switzerland. Remstar had been founded in 1977 (although what is now its Kardex Mlog division had been established in 1922 as Mehne GmbH) and its American subsidiary established in 1981 in Westbrook, Maine.

Kardex Group (2008– )

In 2009, the assets of Kardex US were purchased by Kardex AG and incorporated into the Remstar US operation, which had been established in 1981 based in Westbrook.

As of 2021 Kardex Group consists of two divisions, Kardex Remstar and Kardex Mlog, Mlog having been acquired in 2010 and the Stow division having been spun off in 2013.

Kardex Remstar manufactures and sells materials handling systems for industry, and file handling systems for offices. Products include basic commodities such as file folders and labels as well as more complicated products such as shelving systems and cabinets, vertical lifts, and rack systems.

Kardex Mlog manufactures and sells automated high-bay warehouses and customized materials handling systems.

References

External links
 Kardex Group website 

1898 establishments in New York (state)
1915 establishments in New York (state)
1978 establishments in Ohio
Office supply companies of Switzerland
Office supply companies of the United States
Material-handling equipment
Companies listed on the SIX Swiss Exchange